Reigate Grammar School is a 2–18 mixed private day school in Reigate, Surrey, England. It was established in 1675 by Henry Smith.

History
The school was founded as a free school for poor boys in 1675 by Alderman Henry Smith with Jon Williamson, the vicar of Reigate, as master. It remained in the hands of the church until 1862 when a board of governors was appointed.  Under the Education Act of 1944 it became a voluntary aided grammar school, providing access on the basis of academic ability as measured by the 11-Plus examination. In 1976, it converted to its current fee-paying independent status. At the same time the sixth form was opened up to girls. In 1993, the school became fully co-educational. In 2003, the school merged with a local prep school St. Mary's School. This is now called Reigate St Mary's Prep and Choir School and serves as the junior school, taking children from three to eleven, most of whom then proceed to the senior school.

Reigate Grammar School Vietnam 
Reigate Grammar School officially opened Reigate Grammar School Vietnam in April 2022, being the first UK independent school in the country. The school came to be following a joint venture and merger of the former International School of Vietnam, with the latter rebranding between 2020 to 2022. The school consists of a Preparatory school for Pre-K up to Year 6, a secondary school for Years 7 to 11, and its Sixth form, for years 12 to 13. Reigate Grammar School Vietnam is an IB world school and as such offers the PYP, the MYP, and the Diploma Program. The School is a Cambridge-accredited testing centre and as such a range of IGCSE programs are available

Sixth-form students have the option of studying Cambridge International A-levels or the IBDP, with both programmes currently being taught on the main campus at Hoàng Mai. A planned separate campus is in the works exclusively for Sixth-form students undertaking A-levels in Hoàn Kiếm.

Other International schools 
Reigate Grammar School already has three international schools in China – and an agreement in Morocco to open another.

Facilities

The school site is split into two locations separated by the churchyard. On the "Broadfield" site, named so because of the playing field dubbed "Broadfield" behind the old science block, there are several old and new buildings. Until recently, Broadfield house, an old Reigate home, was where History, Economics, Business studies, Politics and other subjects were taught. It is now used for Drama. Opposite Broadfield house is the Cornwallis building, which is another old Reigate home.

Offsite, the school owns the playing fields at "Hartswood" nearby Woodhatch, where most home matches in most sports are played. Nearby is Reigate Saint Mary's church where every student goes once a week in place of assembly. The nearby Reigate St Mary's Preparatory School is owned by the RGS Foundation, which also operates Reigate Grammar.

Headmaster
Shaun Fenton, son of Alvin Stardust is the headmaster at Reigate Grammar school and executive headmaster of Reigate Grammar School Vietnam. He was previously headmaster at Pate's Grammar School and Sir John Lawes School. He is a member of the Headmasters' and Headmistresses' Conference.

International Headmasters 
Patrick Glennon is the current acting headmaster of Reigate Grammar School Vietnam

Controversy 
In 2013 the school offered to give financial support to Dunottar School in Reigate, and in return Reigate Grammar School would help manage Dunottar. Then in late 2013 it was announced that Dunottar would be closed due to dwindling pupil numbers and poor finances. This caused uproar from the current parents, who planned to manage the school themselves. Reasons for the planned take-over include the selling of Dunottar's school property to fund the new Centre of Learning at Reigate Grammar School. However Reigate Grammar School was unsuccessful and the parents had Dunottar school sign a 10-year contract with United Learning after negotiations. As a result, the new Centre of Learning was funded by the Reigate-based Peter Harrison Foundation.

Notable former pupils

Will Beer, cricketer, Sussex County Cricket Club
Steve Benbow, folk guitar player, singer and music director
Andrew Cantrill, organist
Norman Cook, or Fatboy Slim, musician
Andrew Cooper, Conservative peer
 Vice Admiral Sir Geoffrey Dalton, Deputy Supreme Allied Commander Atlantic, later Secretary General of Mencap
Ben Edwards, BBC Formula One racing commentator and former racing driver
Bill Frindall, BBC cricket scorer
Peter Gershon, British businessman, civil servant and chairman of the National Grid plc
Susan Gritton, singer 
Sir David Hall, British paediatrician
Lennox Hastie, Chef, Firedoor Sydney, as seen on Netflix Series Chef's Table : BBQ
John Haybittle, British Medical Physicist and co-inventor of the Haybittle–Peto boundary
Anthony Hidden, high court judge
Bevis Hillier, English art historian, author and journalist; hoaxer and scourge of A.N. Wilson, and Fellow of the Royal Society of Arts
Godfrey Ince, civil servant
Trevor Kavanagh, political editor of The Sun
Peter Lampl, actor, political activist and organist 
Ray Mears, TV presenter and survival expert
Ben Mee, journalist, author and subject of the film We Bought a Zoo
 John Murrell (chemist), British theoretical chemist who made important contributions to the understanding of the spectra of organic molecules, the theory of Intermolecular force and to the construction of Potential energy surface
Romesh Ranganathan, British stand-up comedian and actor
Alec Harley Reeves, electronics engineer, inventor of pulse-code modulation
Keir Starmer, Former Director of the Crown Prosecution Service, Member of Parliament for Holborn and St Pancras, Leader of The Labour Party
Jeffrey Sterling, Conservative peer and one-time chairman of P&O
 Fred Streeter, horticulturalist and broadcaster
Andrew Sullivan, journalist, blogger, and political commentator
Derek Twine, charity CEO, who was Chief Scout Executive 1997-2013
David Walliams, actor, writer and co-star of Little Britain
Robert Shearman, playwright, short story writer and screenwriter for Doctor Who   - "Dalek" (2005) 
John Westbrook, English theatre actor who appeared in the film The Tomb of Ligeia

References

External links
 

Reigate
Private schools in Surrey
Member schools of the Headmasters' and Headmistresses' Conference
Educational institutions established in the 1670s
1675 establishments in England